The National Garden of Nishapur (or also: Baghmeli of Nishapur, also Romanized as Bagh-e Meli of Nishapur; Persian:باغ ملی نیشابور ) is a historic and a touristic Persian style garden and urban park close to the downtown of Nishapur. This garden is home to the city council of the city and the Nishapur branch of the CIDCA. This garden and the brick made monuments built in its northern entrance of this garden are part of the national heritage list of Iran with the registration number of 13364. Another historical registered site is also located in front of the northern section of this garden with the name of Khanate Mansion and Garden of Amin Islami.

The history of this garden probably dates back to the reign of the Pahlavi dynasty in Iran.

This urban park, along with the Khanate mansion and garden of Amin Islami, is situated next to a hospital and several commercial centers, restaurants, cafes and two hotels.

References 

Nishapur
Tourism
Nishapur County
Gardens
Khorasan
Persian gardens in Iran